Terry Perkins or Terence Perkins may refer to:

Terry Perkins (died 2018), a perpetrator of the 2015 Hatton Garden safe deposit burglary
Terry Perkins, winner of the 1974 TAA Formula Ford Driver to Europe Series
Craig Douglas (born Terence Perkins, 1941), an English pop singer
Terry Perkins, a fictional character in The Bill